Hilltop High School may refer to:

Hilltop High School (Chula Vista, California), in Chula Vista, California, United States
Hilltop High School (West Unity, Ohio), in West Unity, Ohio, United States
Hilltop High School (Whitecourt), in Whitecourt, Alberta, Canada

See also
Hilltop Baptist School, a defunct K–12 school in Colorado Springs, Colorado, United States
Hill Top High School, a defunct school in West Bromwich, West Midlands, England
Hilltop School (disambiguation)